The International Association of Railway Operations Research or IAROR is an organization of academic and professional experts to facilitate the research in the quality of service, timetabling and safety of railway systems.

References

External links
 www.iaror.org
 RailZürich 2009 Conference
 RailRome 2011 Conference

Railway associations
International rail transport organizations